Wellington Street may refer to:

Wellington Street (Ottawa), Ontario, Canada
Wellington Street, Hong Kong
Wellington Street, London, England
Wellington Street, Montreal, Quebec, Canada
Wellington Street, Perth, Australia
Wellington Street (Hamilton, Ontario), Canada
Wellington Street (Toronto), Ontario, Canada